The lymph glands of the thorax may be divided into parietal and visceral — the former being situated in the thoracic wall, the latter in relation to the viscera.

References 

Lymphatics of the torso